The 2006 dengue outbreak in Pakistan was at the time the worst on record.   There were 1931 lab-confirmed cases, and 41 confirmed deaths, according to the World Health Organization Regional Office for the Eastern Mediterranean.  Other sources report a death toll of 52.

Since 2006, studies indicate that dengue fever is on the rise in Pakistan.  It is noted throughout the year, peaking at post-monsoon season. Many factors have been cited, including a surge in the principal mosquito vectors Aedes aegypti. and Aedes albopictus  However, in 2006, an additional factor may have been the lack of patient management standards, since dengue was a relatively new public health challenge for the country.

See also
 2006 dengue outbreak in India
 2011 dengue outbreak in Pakistan
 Mosquito control

References

Disease outbreaks in Pakistan
Dengue Outbreak In Pakistan, 2006
2006 disease outbreaks
Government of Shaukat Aziz
Pakistan